is a Japanese football player, who plays for Morioka Zebra as a midfielder.

Career
Considered as one of the strongest prospects of Japan high school-world, Tanimura signed for Montedio Yamagata in January 2013.

Unfortunately for him, Tanimura won't be fielded with Montedio and started a series of loans in J3: first to Gainare Tottori, then to Grulla Morioka. After some negotiations, Tanimura decided to sign permanently to his home town-side.

Club statistics
Updated to 14 March 2019.

References

External links

Profile at Grulla Morioka

1995 births
Living people
Association football people from Iwate Prefecture
Japanese footballers
J2 League players
J3 League players
Montedio Yamagata players
Gainare Tottori players
Iwate Grulla Morioka players
J.League U-22 Selection players
Association football midfielders